Twenty is a compilation album by Australian alternative rock band, Jebediah. To celebrate the band's twentieth anniversary Jebediah undertook a national tour of Australia and released a collection of twenty songs which spans their entire catalogue. The songs were selected by the band, ranging from "Tracksuit" which appeared on the band's first release, Twitch in 1996 through to "She's Like a Comet", from their fifth studio album, Kosciusko.

The album was released on 29 May 2015 by Sony Music Australia, as a digital download, double CD and double vinyl album, and peaked at No. 32 on the ARIA Albums Chart.

Track listing

Charts

References

External links
 [ Twenty] at AllMusic 
 Twenty at MusicBrainz
 Twenty at Discogs

Jebediah albums
2015 compilation albums